Grindstone 100 miler is an annual 100 mile long ultramarathon that takes place on trails in Virginia's Allegheny Mountains, usually the first weekend of October. The race starts at Camp Shenandoah, a local camp of the Boy Scouts of America. The course then proceeds north following the ridgeline of the Great North Mountain range, crossing over to and following the Wild Oak Trail before continuing north to the summit of Reddish Knob. Runners continue north to Briery Branch Gap before retracing their steps (without summiting Elliott & Reddish) back along the course to Camp Shenandoah.

All sub-38 hour finishers receive a Grindstone 100 Belt Buckle, and a finishers shirt. First place overall male and female runners will receive the Grindstone Champion's trophy. Special awards are also given out to the top 5 male and female finishers, first place male and female masters (40-49), grand masters (50-59) and male super masters (60 and over) and Best Blood.

Grindstone is the fourth race in the Beast Series, which comprises six races: Holiday Lake 50 km, Terrapin Mountain 50 km, Promise Land 50 km, Grindstone 100M, Mountain Masochist Trail Run 50 miler, and the Hellgate 100 km.

The race director is Dr. Clark Zealand

References

External links 
 Official site of the Grindstone 100
 More information on Grindstone
 Detailed Course Mapping Data (.gpx file for navigation)

Ultramarathons in the United States